Kentucky Route 197 (KY 197) is a  state highway in the U.S. state of Kentucky. The highway connects rural areas of Pike County with Elkhorn City.

Route description
KY 197 begins at an intersection with KY 805 at a point northeast of Jenkins, within Pike County. It travels to the northeast, paralleling Elkhorn Creek, and is a very curvy highway. It crosses over Panther and Upper Pigeon branches and Sycamore Creek. In Ashcamp, the highway intersects the southern terminus of KY 195 (Ashcamp Road). After a crossing of Elkhorn Creek, it curves to the north-northeast. It travels through Senterville and enters Elkhorn City. It passes Elkhorn City Elementary School and meets its northern terminus, an intersection with KY 80 (Patty Loveless Drive).

Major intersections

See also

References

0197
Transportation in Pike County, Kentucky